Fratelli Wines is an Indian winery based in Akluj, Maharashtra region of India.

History 
Fratelli means brothers in Italian, it was conceived in 2007 by three sets of brothers: Italy's Secci brothers, Alessio and Andrea, New Delhi-based Sekhri brothers, Kapil and Gaurav, and Mohite-Patil Ranjit and Arjun from Solapur. Production is overseen by the Tuscan winemaker Piero Masi. The company has 240 acres of vineyard in Akluj, Pune, Maharashtra and Karnataka. The Vineyard is accessible to general public for staying and wine tasting. Fratelli Wines are based on French grape varieties plus Sangiovese.

In 2015, Fratelli partnered with Jean-Charles Boisset to import some of its labels into India. In 2018, in partnership with Jean-Charles Boisset, Fratelli launched its J'Noon brand of wines.

In 2018, Fratelli started exporting wines to countries like France and the Netherlands.

In 2020, Fratelli launched four flavours of wine in cans, to target young population. That same year one of Fratelli founders, Kapil Sekhri passed away due to heart attack.

In 2021, Fratelli Wines launched a line of cheese to accompany their wines.

See also 
 Indian wine

References

External links 
 Official Website

Wineries of India
Wine brands
Indian drink brands
Indian companies established in 2007